Muhammad Ahmad (died 29 June 2021) was a Nigerian politician from the All Progressives Congress. He represented Shinkafi on the Zamfara State House of Assembly.

Death 
Ahmad was killed in a bandit attack along the Sheme-Funtua highway in June 2021.

References 

Year of birth missing
2021 deaths
2021 murders in Nigeria
All Progressives Congress politicians
People from Zamfara State

21st-century Nigerian politicians
Members of the Zamfara State House of Assembly